Pål Wessel, pronounced as, and also known as, Paul Wessel, is a Professor of the Department of Geology and Geophysics at the School of Ocean and Earth Science and Technology (SOEST) at the University of Hawaii.  He has taught as a visiting professor at Sydney University in Australia and University of Oslo in Norway. Dr. Wessel is a Fellow of the Geological Society of America.

Open source mapping tools and data
In 1988, he and Walter H. F. Smith created  Generic Mapping Tools (GMT), an open-source collection of computer software tools for processing and displaying geographic and Cartesian datasets. They later supplemented this with the Global Self-consistent, Hierarchical, High-resolution Shoreline Database (GSHHS) that they constructed from two public domain data sets, the World Data Bank II (WDB), also known as CIA Data Bank, and the World Vector Shoreline (WVS) data set.

Geological and geophysical research

Areas in which Pål Wessel has conducted research include:

Periodic co-pulsing of volcanic hot spots, including Hawaii, Yellowstone, Iceland, Easter Island, La Réunion, Tristan, the Galápagos, Samoa, Ontong Java, Tasmantid, the Society Islands, the Azores, Madeira, Canary Islands, Cape Verde Islands, St. Helena, Afar-Kenya, and others
Plate Tectonic Reconstructions and Hot Spot Fixity
Improvement of marine geophysical data sets via data analysis
Thermo-mechanical Evolution and Properties of Oceanic Lithosphere
Flexural Deformation of Lithosphere at Seamounts, Fracture Zones, and Trenches

See also
Generic Mapping Tools
GSHHS
Hawaii hotspot

References

Selected bibliography

External links
: Pål Wessel's GG/SOEST/UHM web page.

20th-century Norwegian geologists
21st-century Norwegian geologists
Fellows of the Geological Society of America
Living people
Norwegian geophysicists
University of Hawaiʻi faculty
Year of birth missing (living people)